= Byzapena =

Inland town of ancient Bithynia

Coordinates: 40°54′24″N 29°39′27″E

Byzapena was an inland town of ancient Bithynia. Its name does not occur in ancient authors, but is inferred from epigraphic and other evidence.

Its site is tentatively located near Yağcılar in Asiatic Turkey.
